Victor Eugene Heerman (August 27, 1893 – November 3, 1977) was an English-American film director, screenwriter, and film producer. After writing and directing short comedies for Mack Sennett, Heerman teamed with his wife Sarah Y. Mason to win the Academy Award for Best Adapted Screenplay of Louisa May Alcott's novel Little Women in 1933. He directed the Marx Brothers' second film, Animal Crackers, in 1930. He and Mason were the first screenwriters involved in early, never-produced scripts commissioned for what would become MGM's Pride and Prejudice (1940 film).

Life and career

As director

She Loved a Sailor (1916, short)
Are Waitresses Safe?: 1917, short)
A Maiden's Trust: (1917, short)
Pinched in the Finish: 1917, short) 
Stars and Bars: (1917, short)
Watch Your Neighbor (1918, short)
His Naughty Wife (1919, short)
Chicken à la Cabaret (1920, short)
The River's End (1920)
Don't Ever Marry (1920)
The Poor Simp (1920)
My Boy (1921)
The Chicken in the Case (1921)
 A Divorce of Convenience (1921)
John Smith (1922)
Love Is an Awful Thing (1922)
Modern Marriage (1923)
Rupert of Hentzau (1923)
The Dangerous Maid (1923)
The Confidence Man (1924)
Old Home Week (1925)
Irish Luck (1925)
For Wives Only (1926)
Rubber Heels (1927)
Ladies Must Dress (1927)
Love Hungry (1928)
Paramount on Parade:  (1930, sequence director) 
Personality (1930)
Animal Crackers (1930)
Sea Legs (1930)
The Stolen Jools: (1931, short)

As writer

Magnificent Obsession: 1954 (based upon the screenplay by) 
Little Women: 1949 (screenplay) 
Meet Me in St. Louis: 1944 (uncredited) 
A Girl, a Guy, and a Gob: 1941 (uncredited) 
Pride and Prejudice: 1940 (uncredited) 
Golden Boy: 1939 (screenplay) 
Stella Dallas: 1937 (screenplay) 
Magnificent Obsession: 1935 (screenplay) 
Break of Hearts: 1935 (screenplay) 
The Little Minister: 1934 (screenplay) 
Imitation of Life: 1934 (uncredited) 
The Age of Innocence: 1934 (screenplay) 
Little Women: 1933 (screenplay) 
Personality: 1930
Love Hungry: 1928 (story) 
Ladies Must Dress: 1927 (story) 
Modern Matrimony: 1923 (story) 
Love Is an Awful Thing: 1922
John Smith: 1922 (story) 
My Boy: 1921
A Divorce of Convenience:, 1921 (story) 
The Chicken in the Case: 1921 (story)

References

External links

1893 births
1977 deaths
English film directors
English male screenwriters
English film producers
Best Adapted Screenplay Academy Award winners
20th-century English screenwriters
20th-century English male writers
20th-century English businesspeople